Jesús Unanua Becerril (born 23 June 1969) is a Spanish former professional footballer who played as a goalkeeper.

He played 204 Segunda División matches over ten seasons, in representation of six teams. In La Liga he was almost exclusively a backup, appearing in the competition with Osasuna, Albacete and Villarreal.

Club career
Born in Pamplona, Navarre, Unanua began his professional career with hometown side CA Osasuna, playing 13 La Liga games in the 1989–90 season. However, he never managed to become first-choice during his early years, and, after a loan spell at Albacete Balompié (also as backup), he returned to his first club, being once again barred, now by youngster Javier López Vallejo, another youth graduate.

After three seasons at Segunda División team CD Leganés, Unanua moved to Villarreal CF, achieving top-flight promotion in his first year although he appeared in no matches, being once again cast aside by Vallejo whom signed at the same time – both players lost importance in the 2002–03 campaign, after the arrival of FC Barcelona's Pepe Reina.

Unanua featured the most he had in years in 2003–04, as he helped Xerez CD to a ninth place. He continued his career also in the second division, with Elche CF.

In 2006, Unanua dropped down to the Segunda División B but stayed in the Valencian Community, joining Alicante CF. In his first year he helped to a return to the second tier after 52 years, and won the Ricardo Zamora Trophy for the season in the competition with only 19 goals conceded in 35 games.

On 17 June 2009, shortly after having been relegated to the bench by manager José Carlos Granero, Unanua announced his retirement from professional football. He played his last match on the 20th between already relegated teams Alicante and Sevilla Atlético (3–3), three days shy of his 40th birthday.

Subsequently, Unanua worked as goalkeeper coach at Villarreal.

References

External links

1969 births
Living people
Spanish footballers
Footballers from Pamplona
Association football goalkeepers
La Liga players
Segunda División players
Segunda División B players
CA Osasuna B players
CA Osasuna players
Albacete Balompié players
CD Leganés players
Villarreal CF players
Xerez CD footballers
Elche CF players
Alicante CF footballers
Spain youth international footballers
Villarreal CF non-playing staff